Oleksandr Anatoliyovych Zavarov, also spelt Aleksandr Anatoljević Zavarov – (born 26 April 1961 in Luhansk, Ukrainian SSR) is a former Ukrainian football midfielder and the former head coach at FC Arsenal Kyiv. In 1986, he was named the best footballer in the USSR and Ukraine and the 6th best footballer in Europe according to France Football. Zavarov is widely regarded to be among the greatest footballers in the history of the USSR and Ukraine, and in 2000 he was included in the Ukrainian Team of The Century according to a poll by the Ukrainsky Futbol weekly.

Club career
Zavarov started off his career in his home city of Zorya Luhansk. He played in the USSR Premier League for Zorya Luhansk (1977–79, 1982), and also SKA Rostov (1980–81). In 1983–88, he played for the Soviet-Ukrainian giants, Dynamo Kyiv, with whom he won the UEFA Cup Winners' Cup in 1985–86, scoring in the final itself. Zavarov later played for Juventus between 1988 and 1990, becoming the first Soviet player to play in Serie A; he won the Coppa Italia and the UEFA Cup under manager Dino Zoff in 1990, and also wore the iconic number 10 shirt in his first season with the team, which had formerly belonged to club legend Michel Platini, although he later switched to the number 9 shirt, and the number 10 shirt was given to Giancarlo Marocchi the following season. Although much was initially expected of Zavarov at the Turin-based club, his time with Juventus was considered to be less successful, despite his two title victories; in spite of the arrival of compatriot Sergei Aleinikov in his second season with the team, Zavarov also had difficulties settling in at the club, due to his strenuous relationship with the club's manager, Dino Zoff, and also as he struggled to learn Italian. He subsequently transferred to Nancy in 1990, where he remained for five seasons, before finally moving to Saint-Dizier in 1995, retiring after three seasons, in 1998.

International career
Zavarov had 41 caps for the USSR, scoring six goals including two in the World Cup finals in 1986 and 1990. He also played in the Euro 1988 in which the USSR team were runners-up.

Style of play
A creative, quick, agile and skilful midfielder, Zavarov was primarily known for his excellent technical ability, two-footedness, stamina, and tactical intelligence, and was usually deployed as an attacking midfielder or as a supporting striker, although he was also capable of playing as a deep-lying playmaker, due to his versatility, vision, and long passing accuracy. Zavarov played a key role in Valeri Lobanovski's successes with Dynamo Kyiv, and his dribbling skills and playmaking ability led his Dynamo Kyiv coach to compare him to Diego Maradona.

Despite the talent he demonstrated and the success he had both with Ukrainian club Dynamo Kyiv and the Soviet national team at Euro 1988, which earned him a reputation as one of the greatest players to ever come out of the Soviet Union, his time in Italy with Juventus was less successful, and he failed to live up to initial expectations in Serie A. Due to his inconsistent displays and his lack of accuracy in front of goal, he drew criticism from the press, who also singled out his surprisingly poor work-rate and movement off the ball; he was also accused of lacking confidence, and of not being an effective assist-provider for the team. Because of his timid character, it was also argued that he lacked the necessary leadership skills to carry the team, and fill the void left by Michel Platini in the advanced midfield playmaking role during the post-Trapattoni crisis.

Managerial career
Zavarov began his coaching career with Saint Dizier CO as a player-coach. He had a short spell as a head coach of FC Wil in 2003–04, however because he lacked the necessary UEFA licence, he was given the position of director of football with the club. He is currently manager of Ukrainian team Arsenal Kyiv.

Career statistics

International goals

Honours

Club
Dynamo Kyiv
Winner
 USSR Premier League (2): 1985, 1986
 USSR Cup (3): 1981, 1985, 1987
 UEFA Cup Winners Cup: 1985–86

Juventus
Winner
 Coppa Italia: 1989–90
 UEFA Cup: 1989–90

International
Soviet Union
 UEFA European Football Championship runner-up: 1988

Individual
 IOC European Footballer of the Season: 1985–86
 Soviet Footballer of the Year: 1986
 Ukrainian Footballer of the Year: 1986
 Ukrainian Team of the Century (poll by "Ukrainsky Futbol"): 2000
 UEFA Cup Winners' Cup 1985–86 top scorer.
 Ballon d'Or
 1986 – 6th
 1987 – 17th
 1988 – 8th
 1989 – 23rd

References

External links
 Player profile and statistics at Ukrsoccerhistory.com
 
 Profile of Zavarov on Arsenal Kiev official site
 

1961 births
Living people
Footballers from Luhansk
Ukrainian footballers
Soviet footballers
Soviet Union international footballers
Soviet expatriate footballers
Ukrainian expatriate footballers
Expatriate footballers in Italy
Expatriate footballers in France
Soviet expatriate sportspeople in Italy
Soviet expatriate sportspeople in France
Ligue 1 players
Ligue 2 players
AS Nancy Lorraine players
Juventus F.C. players
Serie A players
FC Dynamo Kyiv players
FC Zorya Luhansk players
Soviet Top League players
1986 FIFA World Cup players
UEFA Euro 1988 players
1990 FIFA World Cup players
FC SKA Rostov-on-Don players
FC Metalist Kharkiv managers
FC Arsenal Kyiv managers
Expatriate football managers in France
Expatriate football managers in Switzerland
Expatriate football managers in Kazakhstan
FC Astana-1964 managers
Ukrainian Premier League managers
FC Saint Dizier CO managers
FC Wil managers
Ukraine national football team managers
Ukrainian football managers
Ukrainian expatriate football managers
Ukrainian expatriate sportspeople in France
Ukrainian expatriate sportspeople in Italy
Ukrainian people of Russian descent
Ukrainian expatriate sportspeople in Switzerland
Ukrainian expatriate sportspeople in Kazakhstan
Association football midfielders
UEFA Cup winning players
Recipients of the Order of Merit (Ukraine), 2nd class